František Šulc (born 8 June 1950) is a Czech former handball player who competed for Czechoslovakia in the 1976 Summer Olympics.

He was born in Chotěboř.

In 1976 he was part of the Czechoslovak team which finished seventh in the Olympic tournament. He played all five matches and scored twelve goals.

He is the father of the Slovak handball player František Šulc.

External links
 

1950 births
Living people
Czechoslovak male handball players
Czech male handball players
Olympic handball players of Czechoslovakia
Handball players at the 1976 Summer Olympics
People from Chotěboř
Sportspeople from the Vysočina Region